The Church of La Milagrosa, formerly Church of San Vicente de Paul, is a Roman Catholic church in Madrid, Spain. The church was built between 1900 and 1904 under the architects Juan Bautista Lázaro de Diego and Narciso Clavería y de Palacios. The architecture is eclectic, exhibiting Neo-Mudéjar features on the exterior and mainly Neo-Gothic features in the interior.

Location
The church is located on García de Paredes street at the corner of Fernández de la Hoz street.

History
Built between 1900 and 1904, the architects in charge of the project were Juan Bautista Lázaro de Diego, who is associated with Gothic Revival architecture, and Narciso Clavería y de Palacios, who is associated with Moorish Revival architecture.

In 1977 the Boletín Oficial del Estado included the church among a number of buildings to be protected by means of a heritage listing. The definition of the protected area around the monument appears to be ongoing. The monument's protection environment was set out in 1993, but as at 2014 its current protection status as a Bien de Interés Cultural is pending (Incoado con Delimitación).

Architecture and fittings
The exterior has Neo-Mudéjar features, while the inside is predominately Neo-Gothic. The facade has two towers, one on each side, each with a square base and an octagonal steeple. In the past it had a mosaic by Daniel Zuloaga.

See also 
Catholic Church in Spain
List of oldest church buildings

References

Bibliography

External links

Church of La Milagrosa at Viendomadrid.com 

Roman Catholic churches in Madrid
Roman Catholic churches completed in 1904
Bien de Interés Cultural landmarks in Madrid
20th-century Roman Catholic church buildings in Spain
Buildings and structures in Almagro neighborhood, Madrid